Mongolia–Poland relations are bilateral relations between Mongolia and Poland. The countries enjoy good relations, based on growing trade, and political and investment cooperation. Both nations are full members of the OSCE, World Trade Organization and United Nations.

History

Following the conquests of Batu Khan the Mongol Empire bordered Poland in the 13th century. Poland endured three Mongol invasions, in 1240–1241, 1259–1260 and 1287–1288, however, unlike the more-eastern territories, it was not subjugated by the Mongols and retained its independence. In 1245, in Wrocław, Polish friars Benedict of Poland and C. de Bridia joined Giovanni da Pian del Carpine in his journey to the seat of Güyük Khan. It was the first ever trip by western Europeans to the Mongol capital, and was later described in de Bridia's Tartar Relation of 1247, one of pioneering European works on the history and customs of the Mongols. The delegation returned to Europe with the Letter from Güyük Khan to Pope Innocent IV.

After the division of the Mongol Empire and the fall of its successor hordes in Eastern Europe, Mongol-Polish contacts became scarce given the separating distance. Later on, both nations shared a similar fate, with the Mongol realm being divided between the Manchus and Russians in the 17th century, and Poland divided between Russia, Prussia and Austria in the late 18th century. As a result, several Polish deportees from the Russian Partition of Poland visited Mongolia in the 19th century, including orientalist Józef Kowalewski, geologist Aleksander Czekanowski and naturalist Benedykt Dybowski (for more, see Polish–Mongolian literary relations). Józef Kowalewski is considered the founder of Poland's Mongolian studies.

Both nations regained independence in the early 20th century, and in both the Soviet Union eventually installed communist regimes, resulting in vast repressions of its citizens. The post-World War II period saw the development of relations in which Poland assisted Mongolia's industrial development by building factories and participating in geological surveys in search of natural resources. Following the Fall of Communism in Poland, Mongolian anti-communist oppositionists established contacts with members of the Polish Solidarity, and a group of Poles flew to Mongolia to assist the Mongolian Revolution of 1990. After its success, cooperation continued. Polish constitutionalists helped draft the still-effective Constitution of Mongolia of 1992. Poland supported Mongolia's aspiration to join the OSCE, which was achieved in 2012 as a partner for cooperation.

Trade
In 2020, Poland was the second largest source of imports from the European Union to Mongolia, and the seventh largest worldwide.

Military relations
The Polish Armed Forces take part in the annual Khaan Quest military exercise in Mongolia.

Diplomatic missions
 Mongolia has an embassy in Warsaw and an honorary consulate in Kraków.
 Poland has an embassy in Ulaanbaatar and an honorary consulate in Erdenet.

References

 
Poland
Bilateral relations of Poland